Turr or Türr may refer to:
 the milk skin consumed in Nepal
 Frank Türr (born 1970), a German retired football player
 István Türr (1825–1908), a Hungarian soldier and revolutionary
 Uria, a bird known in Newfoundland as Turr